= Renia Kukielka =

Polish-Jewish holocaust survivor

Renia Kukielka (1924−2014) was a native of Poland and a member of the Zionist youth resistance during the Nazi occupation. From 1943 until she escaped Poland in 1944, she was a member of the Freedom couriers, a group of young people who smuggled food, medicine, and weapons into the Ghettos. During this time, Kukielka disguised herself as a Polish Catholic. In 1943, she was arrested and tortured by the Gestapo, but was able to escape and fled to British Mandate Palestine. She published her memoir in Hebrew, titled, Bindudim Uvamachteret: 1939–1943 B'Polin (While Wandering and in the Underground: 1939–1943 in Poland), when she was nineteen years old, before the end of World War II. She died in Haifa, Israel, in 2014.
